London Suite is 1996 American television film directed by Jay Sandrich and starring Kelsey Grammer, Julia Louis-Dreyfus, Michael Richards and Madeline Kahn.  It is based on Neil Simon's play of the same name.

Cast
Kelsey Grammer as Sydney Nichols
Michael Richards as Mark Ferris
Julia Louis-Dreyfus as Debra Dolby
Madeline Kahn as Sharon Semple
Kristen Johnston as Grace Chapman
Richard Mulligan as Dennis Cummings
Patricia Clarkson as Diana Nichols
Julie Hagerty as Anne Ferris
Jane Carr as Mrs. Sitgood
Paxton Whitehead as Dr. McMerlin
Margot Steinberg as Lauren Semple

References

External links
 
 

NBC television specials
American films based on plays
American television films
1996 television films
1996 films
1990s English-language films
Films directed by Jay Sandrich